The Last Romantic is a documentary filmed within the home of concert pianist Vladimir Horowitz. The film contains mainly performances of classical works, but also provides an intimate look into Horowitz's private life.

Description
The Last Romantic is a documentary filmed at Vladimir Horowitz's townhouse on the Upper East Side of New York. It features many performances of some of the pieces of Horowitz's favorite repertoire and sheds light on his thoughts and opinions on music.

During the film Horowitz often jokes and talks about his favorite composers: his friend Sergei Rachmaninoff, Frédéric Chopin, and Alexander Scriabin. Horowitz's wife, Wanda, also contributes her share to the discussions; she shows photo albums and reminisces about their past.

Performances
These are the pieces performed in the film (In order of performance):

Chorale Prelude BWV659 Nun komm, der Heiden Heiland (Bach arr. Busoni)
Piano Sonata No. 10 in C major, K330 (Mozart)
Impromptu in A-flat major, D899 No. 4 (Schubert)
Mazurka No. 13 in A minor, Op. 17 No. 4 (Chopin)
Scherzo No. 1 in B minor, Op. 20 (Chopin)
Consolation, S. 172 No. 3 in D flat major (Liszt)
Prelude Op. 32 No. 12 in G-sharp minor (Rachmaninoff)
Novelette in F major, Op. 21 No. 1 (Schumann)
Étude Op. 2 No. 1 in C-sharp minor (Scriabin)
Polonaise No. 6 in A-flat major, Op. 53 'Héroïque' (Chopin)

Outtakes
Three additional performances were released as a bonus DVD from the 2003 release Horowitz Live and Unedited.
Etude in G-flat major, Op. 10 No. 5 (Chopin)
Etude in F major, Op. 72 No. 6 (Moszkowski)
Au bord d'une source (Liszt)

References

External links
Vladimir Horowitz: The Last Romantic at the Internet Movie Database
Vladimir Horowitz: The Last Romantic at Allmovie

Vladimir Horowitz
1985 television films
1985 films
1985 in music
Concert films
Documentary films about classical music and musicians
Films about pianos and pianists
1985 documentary films
American documentary films
1980s American films